Westinghouse Playhouse is an American sitcom that aired from January to July 1961 on NBC. Starring Nanette Fabray, the series was also known as The Nanette Fabray Show, Westinghouse Playhouse Starring Nanette Fabray and Wendell Corey, and ran under the title Yes, Yes Nanette in syndication.

Overview
The series stars Nanette Fabray, who plays Nan, a successful Broadway star who, after a short courtship, marries Dan McGovern (Wendell Corey), a widower. On their way back to his home in Hollywood Nan learns her new husband has not informed his two children that he was getting married. Nan is then confronted with his two rude children, Buddy (Bobby Diamond) and Nancy (Jacklyn O'Donnell). The following episodes would deal with her troubles and tribulations of dealing with the kids and the housekeeper, Mrs. Harper (Doris Kemper).

The series was canceled after one season.

Cast
 Nanette Fabray as Nan McGovern
 Wendell Corey as Dan McGovern
 Bobby Diamond as Buddy
 Jacklyn O'Donnell as Nancy
 Mimi Gibson as Barbie McGovern
 Doris Kemper as Mrs. Harper

Episodes

External links

References

1961 American television series debuts
1961 American television series endings
1960s American sitcoms
Black-and-white American television shows
English-language television shows
NBC original programming